
Gmina Lubomino is a rural gmina (administrative district) in Lidzbark County, Warmian-Masurian Voivodeship, in northern Poland.

Villages
Gmina Lubomino contains the villages and settlements of Biała Wola, Bieniewo, Ełdyty Małe, Ełdyty Wielkie, Gronowo, Karbówka, Lubomino, Piotrowo, Rogiedle, Różyn, Samborek, Świękity, Wapnik, Wilczkowo, Wójtowo, Wolnica, Zagony and Zajączki.

Neighbouring gminas
Gmina Lubomino is bordered by the gminas of Dobre Miasto, Lidzbark Warmiński, Miłakowo, Orneta and Świątki.

References
Polish official population figures 2006

Lubomino
Lidzbark County